The 2017 Asian Track Cycling Championships took place at the Indira Gandhi Stadium Velodrome in New Delhi, India from 6 to 10 February 2017.

Medal summary

Men

Women

Medal table

References

External links
Official website 

Asian Cycling Championships
Asia
Asian Cycling Championships
International cycle races hosted by India
Cycling Championships
Sport in New Delhi
February 2017 sports events in Asia